Nikolin Çoçlli (born 17 October 1968) is an Albanian football manager and former player.

References

1966 births
Living people
People from Korçë County
People from Korçë
Footballers from Korçë
Albanian footballers
Association football midfielders
KF Skënderbeu Korçë players
FK Partizani Tirana players
KF Tirana players
FK Partizani Tirana managers
Luftëtari Gjirokastër managers
Kategoria Superiore players
Kategoria Superiore managers